The Medina County University Center, or "MCUC," is an extension of the University of Akron.  A three-story structure, this facility opened in 2007 and is located in Lafayette Township in Medina County, Ohio, USA.

The MCUC, under the direction of University of Akron President Gary L. Miller, is the first physical facility in Medina County devoted solely to higher education.

References

External links 
MCUC website

University of Akron
Education in Medina County, Ohio
Educational institutions established in 2007
Buildings and structures in Medina County, Ohio
2007 establishments in Ohio